The United States Equestrian Federation Pony Finals is an annual championship for pony hunters, jumpers, and equitation. The event takes place over six days and is typically held at the Kentucky Horse Park in Lexington, KY. More than 600 ponies compete at the championship every year.

History 
The American Horse Show Association created the hunter pony division in 1951, and shortly after, the International Pony Competition was created for American ponies to compete against British counterparts. The first American Pony Finals took place in 1967 in Deep Run, Virginia after the dissolution of the International Pony Competition. The first event featured only two divisions: the small pony hunters (ponies 12.2 hands and under) and large pony hunters (ponies 12.2-14.2 hands). In 1976, the medium pony division was created for ponies 12.2-13.2 hands in height, shifting large ponies to being 13.2-14.2 hands. The green pony hunter division was created in 1978, and was further divided into two sections (small/medium and large) in 1983.

Over the years the event has always taken place every August and has moved locations several times. It was held five times at the Fairfield County Hunt Club in Connecticut, and also was hosted at the Lamplight Equestrian Center in Wayne, Illinois, the Virginia Horse Center, and The Andrews Osborne Academy in Willoughby, Ohio before finding its permanent home at the Kentucky Horse Park in 2005.

Many top American riders have competed and won at Pony Finals, including Gregory Best in 1975, Lauren Hough in 1985, and Reed Kessler in 2006.

Competition 
Three main sub-divisions take place at Pony Finals: hunters, jumpers and the pony medal. Each require qualification and have a different format.

Hunter Divisions 
There are six hunter divisions that compete separately, although all have the same format and qualifying requirements. The divisions include a regular and green division for each of the three heights (small, medium, and large). The green division is for ponies in their first year competing at the pony hunter height and are judged separately from the regular ponies. Ponies can only compete in one hunter division at the finals. To qualify, ponies must be registered with both the USEF and USHJA and have a current measurement card that states their height, which determines which height they will compete as. They also must receive champion or reserve champion at an "A" or "AA" rated USEF show within the qualifying period. Ponies who were champion the previous year at Pony Finals are automatically qualified for the championship.

Each division is made up of three phases: the model, the under saddle, and the over fences. The model is judged in-hand, with the rider presenting the ponies from the ground and where the pony's conformation, way of moving, and soundness is judged. The under saddle is a standard flat class where ponies are judged on their movement, manners, and soundness at the walk, trot, and canter. Ponies are divided into sections of up to 12 for both the model and under saddle phases. Both phases make up 25% each of the total score for the overall competition. The over fences phase is the final phase where ponies are judged on performance and soundness over a course of jumps, and makes up 50% of the overall score. Ribbons are given through 20th place for each phase, as well as the overall championship. Overall grand championships are given to the pony with the highest total overall score across the three regular divisions and the three green divisions.

Riders may compete only one pony per division and the same rider must ride the pony in all three phases. Riders may not be over the age of 12 to ride a regular small pony, or over the age of 14 to ride a regular medium pony. All pony riders must be under the age of 18 to compete on ponies. Green ponies of any height may be ridden by any junior under age 18.

Jumper Championship 
The USEF Pony Jumper Championships includes several rounds of competition similar to the format of senior championship events. On Thursday, all riders compete in an individual welcome class at a maximum height of 1.05m, followed by two identical rounds on Friday that makes up the team championship, and an individual championship class on Saturday where fences can reach a maximum height of 1.15m. Those that do not qualify for the individual final may compete in the farewell class on Saturday where fences are up to 1.05m.

Riders qualify their ponies through either pony jumper classes or children's jumper classes at USEF rated shows. Individual and team medals are given out for the competition.

Pony Medal Finals 
Pony Medal riders qualify for the finals by earning 30 points in qualifying classes during the qualifying period. Points are awarded for the top three placings and the exact number of points is based on the number of riders entered in the class.

The championship is made up of two rounds and an optional test. All riders compete in the first round and up to 30 are called back to complete a second round. Further testing is at the judge's discretion and aids in determining the winner. The rider may choose any pony to compete on in the final, although the same age rules as the hunter divisions apply.

Recent Champions

References 

Horse showing and exhibition